David Myles FitzSimmons  (born August 4, 1978) is a Minnesota politician and former member of the Minnesota House of Representatives. A member of the Republican Party of Minnesota, he represented District 30B in east-central Minnesota.

Minnesota House of Representatives
FitzSimmons was first elected to the Minnesota House of Representatives in 2012.

On May 9, 2013, FitzSimmons introduced an amendment to add the word "civil" before "marriage" for a gay marriage bill. It was accepted and he was one of only four Republican representatives to vote in favor of the bill. It later passed the House and Senate and subsequently signed by Governor Mark Dayton, legalizing same-sex marriage in Minnesota.

FitzSimmons announced on February 22, 2014 that he would not seek re-election, although he did not rule it out.

Personal life
FitzSimmons is single and has one child. He resides in Albertville, Minnesota.

References

External links

Rep. David FitzSimmons official Minnesota House of Representatives website
David FitzSimmons official campaign website

1978 births
Living people
Members of the Minnesota House of Representatives
21st-century American politicians